"My Ever Changing Moods" is a song by the English band the Style Council. It was their fifth single to be released.

Background
"My Ever Changing Moods" was composed by lead vocalist Paul Weller, recorded at Weller's own studio Solid Bond Studios, and was released in 1984. It is the first single from the band's debut studio album, Café Bleu (1984), which was renamed My Ever Changing Moods in the United States to capitalise on the success of that single.

"My Ever Changing Moods," backed with the Hammond organ instrumental "Mick's Company", peaked at No. 29 on the Billboard Hot 100 the week of 9 June 1984, in the US. The song remains Weller's greatest success in the US (including his efforts in the Jam and as a solo artist).

Versions
The album version features vocals by Weller only accompanied by acoustic piano. This version is 3:37 long.

There are two versions of the song with full band accompaniment. The 7" single version is 4:02 minutes long, while the 12" single version is 5:44 minutes long.

Paul Weller shared a new version of "My Ever Changing Moods" in November 2021.
The track features on his album An Orchestrated Songbook, set for release on 3 December 2021.

Critical reception
In a 2020 article for the Los Angeles Review of Books, Thomas McLean called "My Ever Changing Moods" "one of Weller’s best compositions," identifying the song's debt to the Classics IV's "Stormy" (1968) and its influence on Santana's "The Game of Love". Calling attention to the song's mix of personal and political, McLean reads the song lyric "the hush before the silence, the winds after the blast" as "a potent reference to nuclear fears in the Thatcher/Reagan era" and praises the line "Evil turns to statues," declaring it "as brisk a summing up of commemorative history as I know, and one that takes on new significance in 2020."

Compilation appearances
As well as the song's single release, it has featured on various compilation albums released by The Style Council. The song was included on The Singular Adventures of The Style Council, The Complete Adventures of The Style Council and Greatest Hits.

Music video
The music video for "My Ever Changing Moods," which shows Talbot and Weller cycling down an avenue of trees, was directed by Tim Pope and filmed at Kentwell Hall, Long Melford, Suffolk, UK.

Track listing
 12" Single (TSC X 5, TSCX5)
"My Ever Changing Moods (Long Version)" – 5:44
"Spring, Summer, Autumn" – 2:24
"Mick's Company" – 2:49

 7" Single (817 450-7)
"My Ever Changing Moods" – 4:02
"Mick's Company" – 2:48

Personnel
Credits are adapted from the album's liner notes.
 Paul Weller – lead vocals, guitars
 Mick Talbot – electric piano, organ, backing vocals
 Steve White – drums, percussion
 Peter Wilson – bass synthesizer 
 Hilary Seabrook – saxophone
 Barbara Snow – trumpet

Charts

References

External links

1984 songs
1984 singles
The Style Council songs
Songs written by Paul Weller
Polydor Records singles
Music videos directed by Tim Pope